Maxime Morin (born c. 1969), is a multi-instrumentalist, better known for his work in electronic music under the name DJ Champion or simply Champion. Morin is based in Montreal, Quebec, Canada.

Early music career
Maxime Morin began playing guitar at age 13, playing mostly heavy metal music. He went on to play in a few punk and metal bands, but by the age of 25 he found himself moving away from metal and gravitating towards techno. The transition was a gradual one: "Totally, I was like 'Dance music is crap!' So it was actually a big liberation, to lose my fear of dance music," said Morin in a 2004 interview. Morin's girlfriend at the time took him to a warehouse show and soon he began to attend techno Sundays at Les Foufounes Électriques, a Montreal nightclub better known in the 1980s and 90s for booking punk and alternative rock acts. By 1994 Morin began producing his own dance music and was performing around the Montreal club scene under the names Le Max and Mad Max.  By about age 27 he stopped playing guitar altogether.

In the late 1990s, Québécois composer Benoît Charest attended a Mad Max performance; after the show Charest approached Morin with a business proposal; the two men went on to become co-owners of Ben & Max Studios—a company specializing in jingles and soundtracks.  Ben & Max Studios became quite successful, however in 2001 Morin sold his share in the company back to Charest in order to continue his own personal musical career.  Even after leaving their business partnership, Morin remained in close contact with Charest who was working on the score for the 2003 animated film, The Triplets of Belleville (Les Triplettes de Belleville). Morin would go on to perform the bass and percussion on the song "Belleville Rendez-vous" and he also performed the song live, along with Charest and vocalist Béatrice (Betty) Bonifassi, at the 76th Academy Awards ceremony—Morin played percussion on a bicycle during the live performance. One of the main protagonists in Les Triplettes de Belleville is an aspiring cyclist who happens to be named Champion; Morin has stated that he was already performing under that name before the film was even created.

Work as DJ Champion
By 2001 Morin had become frustrated with commercial music work. As part owner of Ben & Max Studios he was making quite a good living producing music for advertising and film, but he also felt "empty." He decided to leave that world to focus on more personal music. He decided to move in a musical direction where he could combine "the two things that made [him] feel good: Live electronics and guitars..."  He also chose to change his performance name from Mad Max to DJ Champion as a way to poke fun at the growing dance music scene and the resulting outbreak of DJs: "Everybody wanted to be a DJ and wanted to know 'Who's the best DJ?' I was like, 'I don't give a damn about all that crap now. I'm DJ Champion."

The DJ Champion sound was formed by experimenting with the software music sequencer Ableton Live, which is specially designed for live DJing and arranging sounds. He would then layer the digitally produced beats and sounds with guitar loops. During live performances he and his live band would tour as "Champion et ses G Strings" ("Champion and his G Strings"). His live act often consists of four guitarists, one bassist, a vocalist, and Morin working at his laptop and conducting the band. On occasion Morin has also played live drums.

Chill'em All
2005 saw the release of DJ Champion's debut album, Chill'em All. The album included the hit single "No Heaven" — a soulful and bluesy song set against heavy dance beats and noisy guitar riffs. Inspired by Negro Songs of Protest recorded by music collector Lawrence Gellert, Béatrice "Betty" Bonifassi (with whom Morin had previously collaborated on the Les Triplettes de Belleville soundtrack) sings a plaintive tune reminiscent of the work songs sung by the chain-gangs of the American South in the late 19th and early 20th centuries. "I heard Betty singing those blues songs, and she was the girl for that job," said Morin. The single "No Heaven" was used in both a trailer and the ending credits of Gearbox Software's 2009 video game Borderlands, and is used in the opening credits of the television series The Line and the ending credits of the game Army of Two.

Chill'em All won an ADISQ Félix Award in 2005 for "Album of the Year" in the electronic/techno category and was nominated for "Best Dance Recording" at the 2006 Juno Awards. The single "No Heaven" was nominated at the 2006 CASBY Awards in the category "Favourite New Song" and won the SOCAN prize for Dance Music in 2007. DJ Champion's indie debut went on to sell over 100,000 copies across Canada.

Musical projects from 2006 to 2008
In 2006, Morin released The Remix Album, an album featuring remixes of tracks from "Chill'em All" by such guest musicians as Akufen and Patrick Watson. The Remix Album garnered Morin another ADISQ Félix Award for "Show of the Year" and it was also nominated for Dance Recording of the Year at the 2007 Juno Awards. Morin and Bonifassi worked together again on a version of 1957 Screamin' Jay Hawkins hit "I Put a Spell on You"; it was used as the theme song of the Québécois film Truffe which premiered at the Fantasia Festival in January 2008.

Resistance
In the winter of 2008, after a long spate of touring and performing, Morin felt that his newer material was starting to sound too similar to the songs of Chill'em All and he decided to delete an entire studio recording in order to start fresh. Morin withdrew himself from the musical scene and began experimenting. He also recruited Pilou Côté, a young musician from the Montreal music scene, to provide vocals, replacing Betty Bonifassi who had since moved on to her own electronic music project, Beast.

Resistance was released on September 15, 2009. The first single from the album is titled "Alive Again".

Illness and recovery
On May 18, 2010 it was announced on DJ Champion's official website that all confirmed concert dates up until July 3, 2010 were cancelled. It was explained that Morin was "facing a health matter" which required him to "stop all activities in order to regain his strength." As of June 7, an updated statement was added to his official website confirming that he would be postponing all performances indefinitely. On July 4, 2010 DJ Champion's management company, Bonsound, officially announced to the press that Morin was suffering from lymphoma. On January 27, 2011, DJ Champion posted an announcement on his website stating "I ain't sick anymore", and on April 13 another post on his website stated that he would be "gradually resume performing in the coming weeks".

G Strings
DJ Champion tours with a live back-up band normally composed of four guitarists, one bassist and a vocalist. Together they tour as "Champion et ses G Strings" ("Champion and his G Strings").

Current members
Maxime Morin — Main producer, keyboards
Barry Russell — Guitar
Sébastien Blais-Montpetit — Guitar
Pierre-Philippe (Pilou) Côté — Vocals
Stéphane Leclerc — Guitar
Jean-Luc Huet — Guitar
Louis Lalancette — Bass

Past members
Betty Bonifassi — Vocals
 Manon Chaput — Bass
 Blanche Baillargeon — Bass
 Marie-Christine Depestre — Vocals

Discography 
 Chill'em All (2005)
 The Remix Album (2006)
 Live (2007)
 Resistance (2009)
 °1 (2013)
 Best Seller (2016)

Singles chart positions

References

External links
 DJ Champion's official website
 DJ Champion on MySpace

Canadian electronic musicians
Canadian dance musicians
Canadian DJs
Musicians from Montreal
French Quebecers
Living people
1969 births
Electronic dance music DJs